Joan Johnston (born Little Rock, Arkansas) is a best-selling American author of over forty contemporary and historical romance novels.

Biography
Johnston was the third of seven children born to an Air Force sergeant and his music-teacher wife.  She received a Bachelor of Arts in theatre arts from Jacksonville University in 1970, then earning an Master's degree in theatre from the University of Illinois at Urbana–Champaign in 1971. She received a law degree (with honors) at the University of Texas at Austin in 1980.  For the next five years, Johnston worked as an attorney, serving with the Hunton & Williams firm in Richmond, Virginia, and with Squire, Sanders, & Dempsey in Miami.  She has also worked as a newspaper editor and drama critic in San Antonio, Texas, and as a college professor at Southwest Texas Junior College, Barry University, and the University of Miami.

Johnston is a member of the Authors Guild, Novelists, Inc., Romance Writers of America, and Florida Romance Writers. She has two children and one grandchild, and divides her time between two homes, in Colorado and Florida.

Awards
 Paperbook Book Club of America's Book Rak Award (twice)
 Romantic Times' Best Western Historical Series Award (twice)
 Romantic Times' Best New Western Writer
 Romantic Times' Best Historical Series Award (twice)
 The Maggie (twice)
 Romance Writers of America RITA Award finalist for The Disobedient Bride

Bibliography

Contemporary Romance

The Bitter Creek Series
 "Shameless", 2015
 Shattered, 2009
 A Strangers Game, 2008
 The Next Mrs. Blackthorne, 2005
 The Rivals, 2004
 The Price, 2003
 The Loner, 2002
 The Texan, 2001
 The Cowboy, 2000

Hawk's Way
 Hawk's Way: Faron and Garth, 2007 (contains: The Cowboy and the Princess, The Wrangler and the Rich Girl)
 Hawk's Way Brides, 2005 (contains: The Unforgiving Bride, The Headstrong Bride, The Disobedient Bride)
 Honey and the Hired Hand, 2004
 Hawk's Way Grooms, 2002 (contains: The Virgin Groom, The Substitute Groom)
 Hawk's Way: The Virgin Groom, 1997
 Hawk's Way: The Substitute Groom, 1998
 Hawk's Way: Rogues , 2001 (Contains Honey and the Hired Hand, The Cowboy Takes a Wife, The Temporary Groom)
 Hawk's Way Bachelors, 2000 (contains: The Rancher and the Runaway Bride, The Cowboy and the Princess, and The Wrangler and the Rich Girl)
 Texas Brides, 2005 (contains: The Rancher and the Runaway Bride and The Bluest Eyes in Texas)
 Big Sky Country, 2004 (contains: Never Tease a Wolf and A Wolf in Sheep's Clothing)
 Sisters Found, 2002
Hawk's Way Original Silhouette Desire Publication Order (and Numbers)
 SD0424 Fit to be Tied (1988)
 SD0489 Marriage by the Book (1989)
 SD0652 Never Tease a Wolf (1991)
 SD0658 A Wolf in Sheep's Clothing (1991)
 SD0710 A Little Time in Texas (1992)
 SD0746 Honey and the Hired Hand (1992)
 SD0779 The Rancher and the Runaway Bride (1993)
 SD0785 The Cowboy and the Princess (1993)
 SD0791 The Wrangler and the Rich Girl (1993)
 SD0842 The Cowboy Takes a Wife (1994)
 SD0878 The Unforgiving Bride (1994)
 SD0896 The Headstrong Bride (1994)
 SD0937 The Disobedient Bride (1995)
 SD1004 The Temporary Groom (1996)
 - - - - - - The Virgin Groom (1997)
 - - - - - - "A Hawk's Way Christmas" (1997) (in Lone Star Christmas anthology with Diana Palmer)
 - - - - - - The Substitute Groom (1998)

Category Romance
 Fit to be Tied, May 1988, Silhouette Desire #424
 Marriage by the Book, April 1989,  Silhouette Desire #489
 Never Tease a Wolf, 1991, Silhouette Desire #652
 A Wolf in Sheep's Clothing", 1991, Silhouette Desire #658
 A Little Time in Texas, May 1992, Silhouette Desire #710
 Honey and the Hired Hand, 1992, Silhouette Desire #746
 The Rancher and the Runaway Bride, April 1993, Silhouette Desire #779
 The Cowboy and the Princess, May 1993, Silhouette Desire #785
 The Wrangler and the Rich Girl, June 1993, Silhouette Desire #791
 The Cowboy Takes a Wife, March 1992, Silhouette Desire #842
 The Unforgiving Bride, September 1994, Silhouette Desire #878
 The Headstrong Bride, December 1994, Silhouette Desire #896
 The Disobedient Bride, July 1995, Silhouette Desire #937
 The Temporary Groom, June 1996, Silhouette Desire #1004

Anthologies
 "The Bluest Eyes in Texas" in Abduction and Seduction, March 1995
 "Taming the Lone Wolf" in Outlaws and Heroes, Sept 1995
 "A Hawk's Way Christmas" in Lone Star Christmas, Nov 1997

Other Contemporary Romance
 The Men of Bitter Creek, 2004
 Marriage by the Book, 2003, reprint of Silhouette Desire #489
 A Wolf in Sheep's Clothing, 2002, reprint of Silhouette Desire #658
 Never Tease a wolf, 2001, reprint of Silhouette Desire #652
 Heartbeat, 1997
 I Promise, 1996

Historical Romance

Mail-Order Brides Series
 Blackthorne's Bride (Mail-Order Brides #4), July 25, 2017
 Montana Bride (Mail-Order Brides #3), January 7, 2014
 Wyoming Bride (Mail-Order Brides #2), January 1, 2013
 Texas Bride (Mail-Order Brides #1), March 27, 2012

The Sisters of the Lone Star
 Texas Woman, 2003
 Comanche Woman, 2002
 Frontier Woman, 2001

The Captive Heart Series
 The Bridegroom, 1999
 The Bodyguard, 1998
 After the Kiss, 1997
 Captive, 1996

Anthologies
 "One Simple Wish" in Untamed-Maverick Hearts, July 1993
 "The Man from Wolf Creek" in To Have and to Hold, June 1994
 "The Christmas Baby" in A Christmas Together, Oct 1994

Other Historicals
 The Inheritance, 1995
 Maverick Heart, 1995
 Outlaw's Bride, 1993
 The Barefoot Bride, 1992
 Kid Calhoun, 1993
 Sweetwater Seduction, 1991
 Colter's Wife, 1985
 No Longer a Stranger, 2005
 A Loving Defiance'', 1985

References

External links
 Joan Johnston Official Website

Year of birth missing (living people)
Living people
20th-century American novelists
21st-century American novelists
American romantic fiction writers
American women novelists
Jacksonville University alumni
University of Illinois College of Fine and Applied Arts alumni
University of Texas School of Law alumni
20th-century American women writers
21st-century American women writers